Sir Michael Harris Caine (17 June 1927 – 20 March 1999) was an English businessman. He headed Booker Bros and Booker plc, the food wholesalers. His philanthropic activities included co-founding the Man Booker Prize, creating the Caine Prize and the Russian Booker Prize, and serving as president of the Royal African Society.

Career
Michael Harris Caine was born in British Hong Kong on 17 June 1927, the son of economist Sydney Caine, who was later Financial Secretary of Hong Kong and director of the London School of Economics.

Michael Caine attended Bedales, an independent school notable for its progressive ethos. He studied at the University of Oxford, receiving his bachelor's degree after writing on slavery and secession in the United States. He received his master's degree at George Washington University.

He was an executive and board member at Booker plc, chief executive from 1975 to 1979 and finally chairman until 1993, the year he retired.

He helped establish the Man Booker Prize for literary fiction, using the Prix Goncourt as a model. He chaired the Booker Prize Management Committee. He also launched the Russian Booker Prize, awarded from 1992 to 2017.

Caine headed and maintained several Africa-focused organizations and initiatives, including the Royal African Society, London's Africa Centre (for which he chaired the council of management from 1995), the African Emerging Markets Fund, Africa '95 (chairing the executive committee) and the United Kingdom Council for Overseas Students. For his philanthropic work he was knighted in 1988.

Personal life
With his first wife, Janice Mercer, he had one son and one daughter; the couple divorced in 1987. Later that year he married the politician and philanthropist Emma Nicholson. Together they had a foster son, Amar Kanim, who was rescued from Iraq after surviving a napalm attack during the 1991 uprisings there.

Caine was frequently confused with the actor Michael Caine, as his second wife recalled: "An enormous number of times. The phone would ring in the middle of the night, and there would be these inebriated women calling from Los Angeles saying, 'I'm coming over, I'm on the next plane, get my room ready.

Caine died of cancer on 20 March 1999 in London, aged 71.

References

External links 
 "Papers of Sir Michael Caine, 1927-2012; n.d.", Bodleian Archives & Manuscripts, Bodleian Library.

1927 births
1999 deaths
20th-century British philanthropists
20th-century English businesspeople
Alumni of Lincoln College, Oxford
English philanthropists
George Washington University Law School alumni
Knights Bachelor
People educated at Bedales School
Spouses of life peers